Alumni and faculty of the university include many founders and pioneers of academic disciplines, and a large number of internationally acclaimed philosophers, poets, jurisprudents, theologians, natural and social scientists. 56 Nobel Laureates, at least 18 Leibniz Laureates, and two "Oscar" winners have been associated with Heidelberg University. Nine Nobel Laureates received the award during their tenure at Heidelberg.

Besides several Federal Ministers of Germany and Prime Ministers of German States, five Chancellors of Germany have attended the university, the latest being Helmut Kohl, the "Chancellor of the Reunification". Heads of State or Government of Belgium, Bulgaria, Greece, Nicaragua, Serbia, Thailand, a British Crown Prince, a Secretary General of NATO and a director of the International Peace Bureau have also been educated at Heidelberg; among them Nobel Peace Laureates Charles Albert Gobat and Auguste Beernaert. Former university affiliates in the field of religion include Pope Pius II, Cardinals, Bishops, and with Philipp Melanchthon and Zacharias Ursinus two key leaders of Protestant Reformation. Outstanding university affiliates in the legal profession include a President of the International Court of Justice, two Presidents of the European Court of Human Rights, a President of the International Tribunal for the Law of the Sea, a Vice President of the International Criminal Court, an Advocate General at the European Court of Justice, at least 16 Justices of the Federal Constitutional Court of Germany, a President of the Federal Court of Justice, a President of the Federal Court of Finance, a President of the Federal Labor Court, two Attorney Generals of Germany, and a British Law Lord. In business, Heidelberg alumni and faculty notably founded, co-founded or presided over ABB Group; Astor corporate enterprises; BASF; BDA; Daimler AG; Deutsche Bank; EADS; Krupp AG; Siemens AG; and Thyssen AG.

Alumni in the field of arts include classical composer Robert Schumann, philosophers Ludwig Feuerbach and Edmund Montgomery, poet Joseph Freiherr von Eichendorff and writers Christian Friedrich Hebbel, Gottfried Keller, Irene Frisch, Heinrich Hoffmann, Sir Muhammad Iqbal, José Rizal, W. Somerset Maugham, Jean Paul, and Literature Nobel Laureate Carl Spitteler. Amongst Heidelberg alumni in other disciplines are the "Father of Psychology" Wilhelm Wundt, the "Father of Physical Chemistry" J. Willard Gibbs, the "Father of American Anthropology" Franz Boas, Dmitri Mendeleev, who created the periodic table of elements, inventor of the two-wheeler principle Karl Drais, Alfred Wegener, who discovered the continental drift, as well as political theorist Hannah Arendt, political scientist Carl Joachim Friedrich, and sociologists Karl Mannheim, Robert E. Park and Talcott Parsons.

Philosophers Georg Wilhelm Friedrich Hegel, Karl Jaspers, Hans-Georg Gadamer, and Jürgen Habermas served as university professors, as did also the pioneering scientists Hermann von Helmholtz, Robert Wilhelm Bunsen, Gustav Robert Kirchhoff, Emil Kraepelin, the founder of scientific psychiatry, and outstanding social scientists such as Max Weber, the founding father of modern sociology.
Present faculty include Medicine Nobel Laureates Bert Sakmann (1991) and Harald zur Hausen (2008), Chemistry Nobel Laureate Stefan Hell (2014), 7 Leibniz Laureates, former Justice of the Federal Constitutional Court of Germany Paul Kirchhof, and Rüdiger Wolfrum, the former President of the International Tribunal for the Law of the Sea.



Alumni

 Judah Leon Magnes, Chancellor/President of the Hebrew University of Jerusalem,  1925–1948

Faculty

References 

Heidelberg University